NGC 939 is a lenticular or elliptical galaxy in the constellation Eridanus. It is estimated to be 241 million light-years from the Milky Way and has a diameter of approximately 80,000 ly. NGC 939 was discovered on October 18, 1835 by astronomer John Herschel.

NGC 939 is better seen from the southern hemisphere because of its location south of the celestial equator.

See also 
 List of NGC objects (1–1000)

References

External links 
 

Elliptical galaxies
Eridanus (constellation)
0939
009271